Budapester Zeitung (BZT) is a privately owned German-language weekly newspaper published in Budapest, Hungary. It was established in April 1999 and has a circulation of about 7000 copies. Since 2003 there has been an English-language sister newspaper, The Budapest Times. It is published by BZT Media Kft, founded by Berlin-born Jan Mainka.

Since early 2014, BZT has been published in magazine format. Aimed primarily at German-language businessmen and diplomats living in Hungary, it covers politics, the economy, culture and local events as well as world news.

References

External links
Budapester Zeitung website

Newspapers published in Budapest
German-language newspapers published in Hungary
Liberal media
Publications established in 1999
1999 establishments in Hungary
Weekly newspapers published in Hungary